The following were mayors of Lostwithiel, Cornwall, England:

1389–90: John Curteys.

References

 
People from Lostwithiel